Wicked Little Things (also known as Zombies) is a 2006 American zombie horror film directed by J. S. Cardone and starring Lori Heuring, Scout Taylor-Compton and Chloë Grace Moretz. The film was claimed to be based on true events.

Plot
In 1913, in Carlton, Pennsylvania, the cruel owner of the Carlton Mine exploits poor immigrant children as cheap workers. In order to excavate a new shaft quickly, he employs a dynamite charge, but the explosion causes the mine to collapse, burying a large group of the children alive. Following his later trial for willfully causing the death of his workers, Carlton is acquitted, and the mine closed down.

In present day, eighty years later, Karen Tunny has just lost her husband after a long period of terminal disease and has inherited his birthhome near the since-abandoned Carlton mine. She moves to the house with her daughters, Sarah and Emma. The three stop by the local market for supplies and are told by Walter, the shopkeeper, that he doesn't deliver to the area they live in. While driving, Karen has a near miss with a man crossing the road. She exits the car, looking for the man, but he's nowhere to be found. They arrive at the house and Sarah points out the blood on the door while Karen declares it's just "paint."

When Emma hears children giggling, she leaves the house, following the sound of it. Karen goes out looking for Emma and finds her in an old mine. As they try to find their way back to the house, it becomes nightfall, and they get lost. They find a house, which is occupied by Hanks, and enter. Karen is advised by Hanks to stay at home during the night, and he also tells her that there is no need to thank him for the blood smeared on his and the Tunny's door. William Carlton, the last surviving heir of the Carlton estate, which has owned the mine since 1913, is hungrily devouring property and kicking people off his new property.

Meanwhile, the children who died in the mines emerge as zombies and begin to kill, which is dismissed among the community as disappearances, though it is hinted that most of the community is aware of the presence of the children. As it turns out, the Tunny and Hanks families are relatives of the zombie children, who leave blood relatives alive while killing all others. Emma, who has had friendly contact with one of the zombies named Mary, informs her mother that the zombies won't eat her, and that Mary would not directly hurt her mother (who is not a direct Tunny blood relative), but passes on the warning that the other children might. Karen finds some old family photo albums in the basement that contain pictures of her late husband, as well as the Tunny and Hanks children, thus revealing that the family is related to some of the children who died in the mine.

Karen and Sarah leave the house to go look for Emma in the mine. As they exit the shafts after not finding her, they become surrounded by a dozen of the children. They escape, with the children pursuing them, and find Carlton passing through in his car. They enter, telling him to drive, but the tires are slashed before they can pull away. Karen and Sarah run to Hanks' house, unsure of what to do. Soon enough, Karen figures out that Hanks' blood has a supposed repellent effect on the zombie children. As both Hanks and Carlton attempt to shoot the children, they realize the bullets are ineffective, and run to the barn.

Hanks realizes that, as he and Emma are direct blood relatives, it turns out Mary has an older brother, and Karen is in some way protected by Emma's relationship with Mary. The children are really after Carlton, as they blame his family for the mining accident that killed them. The children finally corner Carlton and kill him, thus satisfying their lust for retribution. At the end, the Tunny family drives away after selling the house and leaving it for the children. The film ends with Mary sitting on a bed, clutching a teddy given to her by Emma, and her brother closing the door.

Cast
 Lori Heuring as Karen Tunny
 Scout Taylor-Compton as Sarah Tunny
 Chloë Grace Moretz as Emma Tunny
 Geoffrey Lewis as Harold Thompson
 Ben Cross as Aaron Hanks
 Martin McDougall as William Carlton
 Helia Grekova as Mary

Production
At one point, Tobe Hooper was set to direct the film, but when he dropped out to direct 2005's Mortuary, J. S. Cardone stepped up to direct. The film was shot in the mountains of Bulgaria.

Release
The film debuted as one of the eight films that make up the horror film festival 8 Films to Die For's first cycle in 2006.

References

External links

 

 

2006 films
2006 horror films
Films set in 1913
Films set in Pennsylvania
Nu Image films
Screen Gems films
American supernatural horror films
American zombie films
Films directed by J. S. Cardone
Films shot in Bulgaria
American films about revenge
2000s exploitation films
2000s supernatural films
American exploitation films
American splatter films
2000s English-language films
Films produced by Boaz Davidson
Films about widowhood
Films with screenplays by Boaz Davidson
2000s American films